This is a list of yearly Western Interstate University Football Association football standings.

Standings

References

Western Interstate University Football Association
Standings